The Grand Council of Fascism  (also translated "Fascist Grand Council") was the main body of Mussolini's Fascist government in Italy, that held and applied great power to control the institutions of government. It was created as a body of the National Fascist Party in 1922, and became a state body on 9 December 1928. The council usually met at the Palazzo Venezia, Rome, which was also the seat of the head of the Italian government. The Council became extinct following a series of events in 1943, in which Benito Mussolini was voted out of the Prime Ministry of Italy.

Powers of the Council

Essentially, the council held these powers:
The power to elect the Fascist Party deputies, the nomination for the Party Secretary and other party leaders, the approval of the party statutes and the power regarding the party's policy.
The power to elect the Crown's line of succession including the choice of the heir to the throne, the right of the crown, the power to choose possible successors to the Prime Minister, the power to choose the function and membership of the Grand Council, the Senate, the Chamber of Deputies (later the Chamber of Fasces and Corporations), the power to decide the rights and powers of the Prime Minister, international Treaties, and foreign affairs.

The Grand Council meetings were convened by the Prime Minister himself, and all decrees and laws could only be legalized after receiving his approval. In contrast to the Führerprinzip government model in Nazi Germany, the Grand Council retained the power to recommend that the King of Italy remove the Prime Minister from office. As all the former governing institutions had been subordinated to the Fascist party, the Council was the only check on Mussolini's power.

Overthrow of Mussolini

The Allies invaded Sicily in July 1943. Grand Council member Dino Grandi proposed a vote of no confidence in Mussolini as leader of the Council and the party. A vote was held on the night of 24–25 July 1943 and passed with 19 votes for, 8 against and one abstention. Among the 19 votes of no confidence were those of Mussolini's son-in-law Galeazzo Ciano, who had been former minister of foreign affairs, and the influential marshal Emilio De Bono.

The following day King Victor Emmanuel met Mussolini and informed him that General Pietro Badoglio would lead Italy, as Prime Minister. Mussolini was arrested immediately after the meeting.

In September 1943 Mussolini was freed from imprisonment by German commandos and helped to regain power in northern Italy. He had Ciano, De Bono and three others arrested and tried for treason on 8 January 1944 in Verona. They were executed by firing squad three days later.

Members of the Council
The composition of the Council was revised and defined by a law of 14 December 1929. Its members, selected among the party's gerarchi, are below. Their vote on the 25 July 1943 motion to depose Mussolini is also given next to their name.

Other posts
The Secretary of the National Fascist Party, who was also the secretary of the Council.
The Presidents of the Corporations: Industrialists, Farmers, Industrial Workers, Agriculture Workers.
The Chief of Staff of the MVSN.

The remaining members of the council were chosen by Mussolini himself, and each held appointments of three-year durations.

See also
Italian Fascism
Italian Parliament (1928–1939)

References

Further reading
 2194 Days of War, Cesare Salmaggi & Alfredo Pallavisini (editors),  Gallery Press, New York —  (1977)

1928 establishments in Italy
1943 disestablishments in Italy
Italian Fascism